In public transit, particularly bus, tram, or train transportation, a limited-stop (or sometimes referred to as semi-fast) service is a trip pattern that stops less frequently than a local service. Many limited-stop or semi-fast services are a combination of commuter rail and express train.

The term is normally used on routes with a mixture of fast and slow services, and can differ in meaning, depending on how it is used by different transit agencies. The main benefits of limited-stop or semi-fast services is the ability to utilise skip-stop calling pattern to maximise capacity along the line, as opposed to a commuter service stopping at every station which slows trailing express trains down.

Railways

On railways, the layout of the tracks and number and length of platforms at stations normally limit the extent to which a blend of fast/semi-fast/slow services can be operated.

Australia
In Australia, particularly in Brisbane and Sydney, limited stop services are formed by commuter trains that run as limited stops or express services from the city centre to the edge of the suburban area and then as all stops in the interurban area (an example of such an express pattern can be seen on the Gold Coast line).

Finland 
In Helsinki, Finland, VR commuter rail services are formed by trains that run as limited stops or express from the city centre and then stop all stations in the interurban area. The Y train is one such example.

Japan 
In Japan, the limited stops train is known as a semi-express train ( Junkyū). An example is applied to Nankai Railway's Koya Line.

United Kingdom
In the United Kingdom, some railway stations have tracks for which there are no platforms, allowing a larger number of fast trains to pass them without stopping.

United States
In the United States, some railway stations have tracks for which there are no platforms. For instance, various commuter rail services run along the same tracks as Amtrak's Acela Express and Northeast Corridor routes with four rails, two in the middle for Amtrak, and two on either side for the commuter rail. There are also Express services within those, as at many smaller stations, the Northeast Corridor trains will split off onto the commuter rail tracks to make a stop, and the Acela trains will continue.

Subways

The United States also uniquely has subways that use this method. In New York City, they are numbered as separate lines, which are often part-express, part-local, while others are only express at certain times of day. In Philadelphia, they are considered the same line, but with a few different types of services. The Broad Street Line has the local, which makes all stops; the express, which has an early Southern terminus in the city center; the spur, which makes a few more stops than the express but less than the local, and then branches out to service two other stations), and the special, which is run only during sporting events, and runs as the express but then continues nonstop down to the southern terminus of the local, sharing tracks with the local.

Buses
Traditionally, limited-stop bus services usually operate on an identical or similar route to one or more local bus routes, only serving primary stops, and skipping the others served by local routes. Typically, the stops that are served by limited stop routes are chosen so that stops are evenly spaced or are transfer points, major intersections, or popular destinations. Within downtowns, limited-stop services may stop more frequently. Depending on the transit agency, this can sometimes be referred to as express service. For example, Chicago Transit Authority refers to both this type and non-stop services as express.

Limited-stop bus service is a core component of bus rapid transit (BRT), but differs by not sharing most of the common features of bus rapid transit such as unique route branding, off-vehicle fare collection, signal preemption, frequent all-day service, and dedicated right-of-way. For example, the RapidRide lines in Seattle, Washington are existing local King County Metro routes but with fewer stops and some BRT features being adopted at some stations. In other cities, such as Hong Kong, limited stop bus service currently uses the same branding and has the same features (except stopping less frequently) as regular bus routes.

Other forms of limited-stop bus service other than the traditional type characterized by serving only some of the stops. Some bus routes with portions of the route are non-stop are referred to as limited stop by the transit agency that operates the route.

One form is a route that operates partially on a highway. It is more similar to an express bus route than the traditional limited stop route. However, the non-stop portion of the route is typically shorter than that of an express route, and the fare structure of the transit agency cause a limited stop route to have a lower fare than an express route.

One example of this type of route would be Metro Transit Route 114 in Minneapolis, MN. The route originates at the University of Minnesota campus in Minneapolis, then it travels several miles on Interstates 35W and 94, before it begins to operate as local service through the Uptown area of Minneapolis.

Another form of limited stop bus service includes local routes that may operate certain trips with limited or non-stop sections. For example, to aid commute times for downtown workers, Metro Transit Route 12 in Minneapolis operates during peak hours as non-stop for approximately eight blocks between Franklin Avenue and Uptown Transit Station, but the route serves all stops along that section at other times.

See also
 Bus rapid transit
 Express bus service
 Express train
 Limited express
 Skip-stop

References

Passenger rail transport